Palçıqoba (also, Palchykhoba) is a village and municipality in the Khachmaz Rayon of Azerbaijan.  It has a population of 1,524.  The municipality consists of the villages of Palçıqoba and Çinartala.

References 

Populated places in Khachmaz District